John Larkin Kerwin  (June 22, 1924 – May 1, 2004) was a Canadian physicist.

Born in Quebec City, he studied physics at St. Francis Xavier University and obtained his master's degree in physics at the Massachusetts Institute of Technology. His received his D.Sc. from Université Laval. He was Chairman of the Department of Physics from 1961 to 1967. He was the first lay Rector of Université Laval, holding this position from 1972 to 1977.

From 1954 to 1955 he was the president of the Canadian Association of Physicists. From 1980 to 1985 he was President of the National Research Council of Canada and was the first president of the Canadian Space Agency and coined the term Canadarm. In 1982 he received the Gold Medal from the Canadian Council of Professional Engineers. In 1987 he was awarded the Outstanding Achievement Award of the Public Service of Canada. In 1989 he was president of the Canadian Academy of Engineering. Kerwin also served at an international level, he was president of the International Union of Pure and Applied Physics (IUPAP) from 1987–1990.

In 1976, he received an honorary doctorate from Concordia University, one of 15 from various universities. In 1978 he was made an Officer of the Order of Canada and was promoted to Companion in 1980. In 1988 he was made an Officer of the National Order of Quebec. He was elected Fellow of the Royal Society of Canada and was president from 1976 to 1977. He was made an Officer of the Légion d'honneur de France.

He died in Quebec City, Quebec, Canada. He was married to Maria G. Turcot and had 8 children.

Honours 
 Knight of the Holy Sepulchre
 Companion of the Order of Canada
 Officer de l'Ordre national du Quebec
 Officier de l'Ordre de la Légion d'honneur (France)
 15 Honorary Doctorates

References

 
 

1924 births
2004 deaths
Academics in Quebec
Anglophone Quebec people
Canadian physicists
Companions of the Order of Canada
Fellows of the Royal Society of Canada
Fellows of the American Physical Society
MIT Department of Physics alumni
Officers of the National Order of Quebec
People from Quebec City
Presidents of the Canadian Space Agency
Rectors of Université Laval
Space program of Canada
Université Laval alumni
Knights of the Holy Sepulchre
Academic staff of Université Laval
Presidents of the Canadian Association of Physicists
Presidents of the International Union of Pure and Applied Physics